This article is about the particular significance of the year 1995 to Wales and its people.

Incumbents

Secretary of State for Wales – John Redwood (until 26 June); David Hunt (Acting); William Hague (from 5 July)
Archbishop of Wales – Alwyn Rice Jones, Bishop of St Asaph
Archdruid of the National Eisteddfod of Wales – John Gwilym Jones

Events
3 January – Tower Colliery re-opens under the ownership of the workforce buyout company Goitre Tower Anthracite.
1 February – Richey Edwards of the Manic Street Preachers disappears.
16 February - In the Islwyn by-election brought about by the resignation of Neil Kinnock, Don Touhig is elected as Labour MP for the constituency.
April – TBI plc purchases Cardiff-Wales Airport from Glamorgan County Council.
20 July – Swansea-born Michael Heseltine becomes Deputy Prime Minister of the United Kingdom, an office last held by Geoffrey Howe.
30 July – Police in North Wales launch a murder inquiry after the body of seven-year-old Sophie Hook (who had gone missing from a nearby house during the night) is found on a beach near Llandudno by a man walking his dog.
6 August - Howard Hughes, a 30-year-old Colwyn Bay man, is charged with the murder of Sophie Hook.
November - Diver Keith Hurley discovers the wreck of the submarine Resurgam (sunk 1880) off Rhyl.
20 November - The Princess of Wales gives a revealing interview to Martin Bashir for the Panorama current affairs television programme on BBC 1 , discussing her personal problems and marriage in candid detail.
20 December – The Queen writes to The Prince and Princess of Wales urging them to divorce as soon as possible.
Welsh historian Sir Rees Davies is appointed to the Chichele Chair of Medieval History in the University of Oxford.
Historian Glanmor Williams is knighted.

Arts and literature
Roger Rees is nominated for a Tony for Best Actor in a Play for his role in Indiscretions.
Michael Ball performs in the Les Misérables tenth anniversary concert.
Peter Karrie is voted the favourite Phantom of members of The Phantom of the Opera Appreciation Society for the second year in a row.
The Dylan Thomas Centre, Swansea, is opened by Jimmy Carter.

Awards
Glyndŵr Award – Kyffin Williams
National Eisteddfod of Wales (held in Abergele)
National Eisteddfod of Wales: Chair – Tudur Dylan Jones
National Eisteddfod of Wales: Crown – Aled Gwyn
National Eisteddfod of Wales: Prose Medal – Angharad Jones for Y Dylluan Wen
Wales Book of the Year:
English language: Duncan Bush, Masks
Welsh language: Aled Islwyn, Unigolion, Unigeddau
Gwobr Goffa Daniel Owen – Beryl Stafford Williams

New books
Roger Boore – Y Bachgen Gwyllt
Robin Llywelyn – Y Dwr Mawr Llwyd
R. S. Thomas – No Truce with the Furies
Aled Rhys Wiliam – Cywain

Film

English-language films
The Englishman Who Went Up a Hill But Came Down a Mountain, with Kenneth Griffith
Restoration is partly filmed at Caerphilly Castle.

Welsh-language films

Music
Robin Huw Bowen – Harp Music of Wales (Cerddoriaeth Telyn Cymru)
Carreg Lafar – Ysbryd y Werin
Dafydd Iwan – Cân Celt
Super Furry Animals – Llanfairpwllgwyngyllgogerychwyndrobwllantysiliogogogochynygofod (in space) (E.P.)
Triskedekaphilia (compilation album)

Broadcasting
30 September – 96.4 FM The Wave goes on air for the first time.

Welsh-language television
A55, starring Iwan "Iwcs" Roberts
Rownd a Rownd, a youth-oriented soap opera set and filmed around Menai Bridge, launches on S4C

English-language television
John Rhys-Davies takes the lead in the new US drama series, Sliders.
Somebody's Son (prizewinning documentary made for BBC2 and BBC Wales by Raw Charm).

Sport

BBC Wales Sports Personality of the Year – Neville Southall
Rugby Union
4 June – A narrow defeat by Ireland results in Wales being eliminated from the Rugby World Cup competition after only three matches.

Births
5 January – Tom John, footballer
13 February – Leona Vaughan, actress
30 June – Declan John, footballer
4 July – Amy Hill, cyclist
9 October – Jasmine Joyce, rugby player
12 October – Jordan Howe, Paralympic athlete
30 November – Seb Morris, racing driver

Deaths
28 January – Philip Burton, theatre director and radio producer, 90
2 February - Raymond Bark-Jones, English-born Wales international rugby union player, 83
4 February - David Alexander, singer, 56
8 February – Don Devereux, dual-code rugby player, 62
8 February – Rachel Thomas, actress, 89
11 March – Myfanwy Talog, actress, 50
28 March - Julian Cayo-Evans, political activist, 57
10 April – Glyn Jones, poet, author and academic, 90
12 April – Cyril Sidlow, footballer, 89
21 April – Tessie O'Shea, entertainer, 82
21 June – Tristan Jones, sailor, 66
24 June – Len Blyth, Wales international rugby player, 74
25 September – Dave Bowen, footballer, 67
26 September – Lynette Roberts, poet, 86

See also
1995 in Northern Ireland

References

Wales